Xincheng District is one of 11 urban districts of the prefecture-level city of Xi'an, the capital of Shaanxi Province, Northwest China. It includes the northwestern part of Xi'an's walled city, as well as a number of neighborhoods to the east and northeast. Xi'an railway station is within Xincheng District. The district borders the districts of Weiyang to the north, Baqiao to the east, Yanta to the south, Beilin to the southwest, and Lianhu to the west. Xincheng is also the seat of Shaanxi province.

Administrative divisions
As 2020, Xincheng District is divided to 9 subdistricts.
Subdistricts

References

External links

Districts of Xi'an